Tallán, or Atalán, is an extinct and poorly attested language of the Piura Region of Peru.  It is too poorly known to be definitively classified. See Sek languages for a possible connection to neighboring Sechura.

In Glottolog and in Jolkesky (2016), the two attested Catacaoan languages, Catacao and Colán, are listed as dialects of Tallán.

Dialects
Mason (1950) lists Apichiquí, Cancebí, Charapoto, Pichote, Pichoasac, Pichunsi, Manabí, Jarahusa, and Jipijapa as dialects of Atalán.

Rivet (1924) lists Manta, Huancavilca, Puna, and Tumbez within an Atalán family.

Further reading
Ramos Cabredo, J. (1950). Ensayo de un vocabulario de la lengua Tallán o Tallanca. Cuadernos de Estudio del Instituto de Investigaciones Históricas, 3:11-55. Lima: Pontificia Universidad Católica del Perú.

References

Languages of Peru
Unclassified languages of South America